The 2010 Bulgarian Supercup was a football match played on 11 August 2010 between 2009–10 A PFG champions Litex Lovech and 2009–10 Bulgarian Cup winners Beroe. Litex won the game 2–1, after the match finished 1–1 after 90 minutes. The French players Alexandre Barthe and Wilfried Niflore scored Litex's goals.

Match details

References

Bulgarian Supercup
PFC Litex Lovech matches
Supercup